Through the Eyes of a Painter is 1967 Indian film written, directed and filmed by M. F. Husain, the famous Indian painter. The film was produced by the Films Division of Government of India.

Overview
Hussain chose Rajasthan as the place, which he often visited hitherto to draw the paintings. He filmed various places and scenery very much known to him. Whatever came close to his heart was filmed. There is not a single dialogue in this film of fifteen minutes duration.

Here one royal face of Rajasthani man, there one goat roaming in front of a tiger model, standing and looking into the infinite skies centuries together of a ruin, a hawk flying into the blue seas, dispersing of the school children with cries listening to the school-bell, women bathing at the river bank, lines in the desert, an anklet lying over there among the lines, a window with a beautiful sculpture, a dirty canal in front of a house....like this, from one thing to another, like a child's heart, like a sparrow, the camera moves ... in between, a lantern, an umbrella, a sandal appear...

The heart of this film is its music, which was composed by Elchuri Vijaya Raghava Rao of Andhra Pradesh. Hindustani music lovers know Vijaya Raghava Rao as a renowned flute - maestro. He imparted musical training to Ronu Majumdar, another flute - maestro. He also worked in various films and dramas as a musician and actor, music composed by Pandit Ravi Shankar.

Husain said, "He rightly understood my feelings and composed the music, otherwise I would have been doomed." The sound was given by another artist from Andhra Pradesh, Jasti Raghavendra Rao, hailing from Eluru.

The film Through the Eyes of a Painter fetched the 1st prize, in The Golden Bear 17th International Film Festival during the first week of July 1967, held in Berlin. It was nominated in the Goa Film Festival as well but unfortunately, it was later withdrawn due to a protest movement against this.

Awards
 1967: Berlin International Film Festival: Golden Bear: Short Film: M.F. Husain
 1968: Melbourne International Film Festival, screened

References

 Years of Vision, Padmabhushan P.P.Rao festschrift,nov'2008; Vakati Pandu RangaRao's Essay Through the Eyes of a Painter

External links
 

Indian short films
1967 films
Biographical films about artists
Cultural depictions of Indian men
Cultural depictions of 20th-century painters